Procambarus liberorum is a species of crayfish in the family Cambaridae. It is endemic to the United States, where it occurs in Arkansas and Oklahoma. It is known commonly as the Osage burrowing crayfish.

Distribution
In Arkansas, P. liberorum is found in the Boston Mountains, Ouachita Mountains, and Arkansas Valley, as far east as Lonoke County. It was discovered in Le Flore County, Oklahoma, in 2006.

Taxonomic history

Procambarus liberorum was originally described from three specimens caught by a cat in Bentonville, Arkansas.

The species Procambarus ferrugineus was considered to be an endangered species on the IUCN Red List, but it is now known to be identical to the widespread and secure P. liberorum, which is listed as a least-concern species.

References

External links

Cambaridae
Crustaceans of the United States
Natural history of Arkansas
Natural history of Oklahoma
Freshwater crustaceans of North America
Crustaceans described in 1978
Taxa named by Horton H. Hobbs Jr.
Taxa named by Joseph F. Fitzpatrick Jr.